Below are the rosters for the 2010 UEFA European Under-17 Championship tournament in Liechtenstein. Players whose names are marked in bold went on to earn full international caps.

Players' ages as of the tournament's opening day (18 May 2010).

Group A

Head coach: Guy Ferrier

Head coach: Rui Bento

Head coach: Ginés Meléndez

Head coach: Heinz Moser

Group B

Head coach: Štol Jiří

Head coach: John Peacock

Head coach: Leonidas Vokolos

Head coach: Abdullah Ercan

References

 UEFA.com > UEFA European Under-17 Championship > Teams
 2010 UEFA European Under-17 Championship

UEFA European Under-17 Championship squads
squads